Jonathan Mark Hamilton Priaulx Raban (14 June 1942 – 17 January 2023) was an award-winning British travel writer, playwright, critic, and novelist.

Background 

Jonathan Raban was born in 1942 in Norfolk. He was son of Monica Raban (née Sandison) and the Rev Canon J. Peter C.P. Raban, whom he did not actually meet until he was three. He was sent to boarding school at the age of five. He was educated at King's School, Worcester, where like his father he was unhappy but discovered the comforting value of literature. He went on to study English at Hull University, where he became friends with the poet Philip Larkin. He supported himself by teaching English and American Literature.

Career

Raban began his career lecturing at Aberystwyth University in Wales. He then moved to the creative writing department of the University of East Anglia under Malcolm Bradbury. Among his pupils there were the future novelists Rose Tremain and Ian McEwan.

In 1969 Raban moved to London and became a freelance writer and journalist, specialising in book reviews. From 1974 he wrote regular pieces of literary criticism for the newly-founded New Review. In 1979 he embarked on his career as a travel writer with his first work Arabia Through The Looking Glass. He followed up in 1981 with Old Glory, which recounted his journey down the Mississippi from Minneapolis to New Orleans.  In addition to his travel books he wrote three novels, starting with Foreign Land in 1985. This was followed by Waxwings in 2003 and Surveillance in 2006. As he became better known, his writing diversified into short fiction which was published in The London Magazine, alongside radio plays for the BBC, and numerous book reviews for The New York Review of Books and The Sunday Times. The editor of The Sunday Times labelled him "the most troublesome reviewer ... ever" but kept him on as a reviewer even though he sent back many books without reviewing them.

His travel books combined observation of place with current events and personal reflection. His writing, as The Daily Telegraph put it, mixed "fact, fiction, travelogue, sociology, historical anecdote, reportage, memoir, confessional and literary criticism, and [created] a style entirely his own." Raban said of this work that the books were "concerned with what used to be called 'human geography': writing about place--about people's place in place, and their displacement in it" and owed "something to the novel, something to the essay, something to the memoir, something to history, and biography, and criticism, and geography." Old Glory is set during the build-up to Ronald Reagan’s victory in the 1980 presidential election, Coasting as the Falklands War begins, and Passage to Juneau as the failure of Raban’s marriage became apparent. For Coasting, which like Foreign Land described a sailing trip all round the island of Britain, he learnt to sail in three weeks, instructed by a retired naval officer, and set off in a 30-foot wooden ketch. Despite his reservations, he found that he really liked sailing on his own.

Personal 

Raban married three times, first to Bridget (Bridie) Johnson in 1964 whom he met at university; then to Caroline Cuthbert, an art dealer, in 1985; and finally to Jean Lenihan in 1992. All three marriages ended in divorce. From 1990 he lived with his daughter in Seattle.

In 2011, Raban suffered a stroke which left him in a wheelchair. He died from related complications in Seattle on 17 January 2023, at the age of 80.

Awards 

Raban received multiple awards, including the National Book Critics Circle Award, The Royal Society of Literature's Heinemann Award, the Thomas Cook Travel Book Award, the PEN West Creative Nonfiction Award, the Pacific Northwest Booksellers Association Award, and a 1997 Washington State Governor's Writer's Award. In 2003, his novel Waxwings was long listed for the Man Booker Prize.

Heinemann Award, 1982
Thomas Cook Travel Book Award, 1981 and 1991
National Book Critics Circle Award, 1996
The Stranger newspaper "Genius Awards", 2006 Article

Bibliography

Plays 
Square (teleplay), Granada, 1971.

A Game of Tombola, BBC Radio 3, 1972.

Water Baby BBC Radio 2, 1975 

At the Gate, BBC Radio 3, 1975.

The Anomaly BBC Radio 3, 1975 

Snooker (teleplay), BBC-TV, 1975.

Square Touch Old Vic Theatre, Bristol, England, 1977 

Will You Accept the Call? BBC Radio 3, 1977

The Sunset Touch, 1977

Travel Books 

 Soft City (1974), Hamish Hamilton, 
 Arabia Through the Looking Glass (1979), William Collins, 
 Old Glory: An American Voyage (1981),  William Collins, 
 Coasting (1986), Harvill Press, 
 Hunting Mister Heartbreak: A Discovery of America (1990), Collins Harvill, 
 The Oxford Book of the Sea (editor) (1992), Oxford University Press, 
 Bad Land: An American Romance (1996), Picador and Pantheon Books, 
 Passage to Juneau: A Sea and Its Meanings (1999),  Picador and Pantheon Books, 
 Driving Home: An American Journey (2011), Pantheon Books,

Novels 

 Foreign Land (1985), Collins Harvill, 
 Waxwings (2003), Picador and Pantheon Books, 
 Surveillance (2006), Picador and Pantheon Books, 

Essays
 “In the wild West the improbable is always possible” Pacific North West 26 September, 2004 
 'Battleground of the Eye' Atlantic Monthly 1 March 2001 pp 40–52
 'Granny in the Doorway', London Review of Books 17 August 2017 pp 41–43
 ‘I felt pretty happy that I was still alive’, The Guardian 30 December 2016
 
 'The Hostile City' Architectural Review  vol 154 no. 919, September 1973 pp150-158

Interviews
 The Arts Fuse (6 Mar 2007) – Interview with Jonathan Raban about the Critical Condition and his novel, Surveillance
 University of Washington, Upon Reflection – Video interview with Jonathan Raban about his book on immigrants in Montana, Badlands
 Hitler's Coming; Time for Cocktails and Gossip interview with Jonathan Raban on National Public Radio series 'You must read this' re Evelyn Waugh’s Put Out More Flags. 1 July 2008

Other writing 

The Technique of Modern Fiction: Essays in Practical Criticism, Edward Arnold (London, England) (1968)
Mark Twain: Huckleberry Finn (1968)
 The Society of the Poem (1971)
 For Love & Money: A Writing Life, 1968-1987 (1989), 
 God, Man and Mrs Thatcher: A Critique of Mrs Thatcher's Address to the General Assembly of the Church of Scotland (1989), 
 My Holy War: Dispatches From the Home Front (2006),

References

External links

 
 
 
 
 
 Internet Movie Database, IMDb, Raban as a newsreader, Jonathan Raban
Raban author page and archive from The New York Review of Books

1942 births
2023 deaths
20th-century English male writers
20th-century English novelists
21st-century English male writers
21st-century English novelists
Academics of Aberystwyth University
Academics of the University of East Anglia
Alumni of the University of Hull
British travel writers
English male novelists
Fellows of the Royal Society of Literature
London Review of Books people
People educated at King's School, Worcester
People from North Norfolk (district)
Writers from Seattle
English emigrants to the United States